Paolo Pedretti (22 January 1906 – 22 February 1983) was an Italian cyclist who competed in the 1932 Summer Olympics. He won the gold medal in the team pursuit event.

References

1906 births
1983 deaths
Italian male cyclists
Olympic cyclists of Italy
Cyclists at the 1932 Summer Olympics
Olympic gold medalists for Italy
Olympic medalists in cycling
Cyclists from the Province of Como
Medalists at the 1932 Summer Olympics
Italian track cyclists
20th-century Italian people